Polygonatum pubescens, the hairy Solomon's seal or downy Solomon's seal, is a species of flowering plant in the family Asparagaceae, native to the north-central and eastern US and eastern Canada. It is a forest gap specialist.

References

pubescens
Flora of Ontario
Flora of Quebec
Flora of New Brunswick
Flora of Nova Scotia
Flora of Minnesota
Flora of Iowa
Flora of Wisconsin
Flora of Illinois
Flora of the Northeastern United States
Flora of Kentucky
Flora of Tennessee
Flora of Alabama
Flora of Georgia (U.S. state)
Flora of Maryland
Flora of Washington, D.C.
Flora of Delaware
Flora of Virginia
Flora of North Carolina
Plants described in 1813
Flora without expected TNC conservation status